UCL may refer to:

Education 
 University College London, a university in England
 University College Lahore, a university in Pakistan
 Université catholique de Louvain, a university in Belgium
 University College Lillebaelt, a university in Denmark
 Universities' Central Library, a university library in Myanmar

Other uses  
 UEFA Champions League, an annual football competition
 Ulnar collateral ligament, in anatomy
 United Counties League, a football league in England
 Upper control limit, in statistics
 Union communiste libertaire, French anarchist organisation
 Uganda Clays Limited, Ugandan company